Genesis Health System is a non-profit health system based in Davenport, Iowa. The system provides health services to multiple communities in Eastern Iowa and Western Illinois 6 different hospitals. Genesis is the largest employer in Scott County, Iowa and the third largest in the Quad City area with 5,200 employees. Its President and CEO is Doug Cropper.

History

Genesis originally consisted of two hospitals that joined on May 24, 1994, to form the system. The two founding hospitals were Mercy Hospital and St. Luke's Hospital, both in Davenport, Iowa. The former was founded by the Sisters of Mercy in response to an influenza outbreak in the area in 1869.

Today, Genesis operates a total of five hospitals and manages Jackson County Regional Health Center in Maquoketa, IA.

Mercy Hospital

Established by Mother Mary Borromeo Johnson and the Sisters of Mercy, Mercy Hospital received its first patient on December 7, 1869. In 1872, St. Elizabeth's Hospital for the Mentally ill was opened adjacent to Mercy Hospital. 

Because of the 1918 flu pandemic, Mercy Hospital was forced to open an extension in Turner Hall in order to accommodate the patients. In 1924, Mercy Hospital was one of the first hospitals accredited by the American College of Surgeons.

In 1932, a new wing was opened and in 1954, a new facility replaced the original building. The idea to merge Mercy Hospital and St. Luke's was introduced in 1973 and initially rejected.

Another new Mercy Hospital was constructed 1978, with the construction of medical office buildings following just two years later in 1980. In order to fit the needs of a growing patient population, Mercy Hospital announced plans to expand again in 1987.

In 1993, the boards of St. Luke's and Mercy Hospital agreed to merge. The merger was completed in 1994.

St. Luke's Hospital

Founded in 1893 at the corner of 8th and Main Street in Davenport, St. Luke's Hospital mainly acted as an emergency care facility. In 1914, St. Luke's relocated to East Rusholme Street, the current location of Genesis Medical Center, East Campus.

In 1951 and again in 1964, additions to the new St. Luke's facility were completed.

St. Elizabeth's Fire

On 7 January 1950, a fire destroyed St. Elizabeth's Hospital for the Mentally Ill, killing 41 individuals and injuring 24 others, the majority of which were patients. According to most sources, the fire was caused by Elnora "Ellie" Epperly, a 23-year-old patient who, believing that her husband was in trouble and that she needed to escape, lit curtains with a cigarette lighter. 

Initially charged with murder, Elnora Epperly never faced trial after an inquest ruled that she was mentally ill and thus couldn't be accounted for her crime.

After spending the next several months in an Illinois hospital, Ellie was released into the custody of her husband, John.

Now the location of Genesis Medical Center, West Central Park, a small cemetery has been erected in honor of those who died as a result of St. Elizabeth's fire. Sixteen of the 41 victims are buried at the site.

Hospitals

References

Davenport, Iowa
Hospital networks in the United States
Healthcare in Iowa
Healthcare in Illinois
Companies based in the Quad Cities
Medical and health organizations based in Iowa